A Married Couple is a 1983 Israeli drama film directed by Yitzhak Yeshurun. The film was selected as the Israeli entry for the Best Foreign Language Film at the 56th Academy Awards, but was not accepted as a nominee.

Cast
 Zivit Abramson
 Amnon Dankner
 Miri Fabian
 Ruth Harlap
 Avi Kleinberger
 Yaron London

See also
 List of submissions to the 56th Academy Awards for Best Foreign Language Film
 List of Israeli submissions for the Academy Award for Best Foreign Language Film

References

External links
 

1983 films
1983 drama films
Israeli drama films
1980s Hebrew-language films